St. Lucas is a city in Fayette County, Iowa, United States. The population was 167 at the time of the 2020 census.

Geography
St. Lucas is located at  (43.063955, -91.934641).

Demographics

2010 census
As of the census of 2010, there were 143 people, 73 households, and 44 families living in the city. The racial makeup of the city was 100.0% White.

There were 73 households, of which 17.8% had children under the age of 18 living with them, 50.7% were married couples living together, 2.7% had a female householder with no husband present, 6.8% had a male householder with no wife present, and 39.7% were non-families. 35.6% of all households were made up of individuals, and 20.6% had someone living alone who was 65 years of age or older. The average household size was 1.96 and the average family size was 2.43.

The median age in the city was 52.5 years. 11.9% of residents were under the age of 18; 9.8% were between the ages of 18 and 24; 17.5% were from 25 to 44; 28% were from 45 to 64; and 32.9% were 65 years of age or older. The gender makeup of the city was 51.7% male and 48.3% female.

2000 census
As of the census of 2000, there were 178 people, 83 households, and 54 families living in the city. The racial makeup of the city was 100.00% White.

There were 83 households, out of which 20.5% had children under the age of 18 living with them, 57.8% were married couples living together, 4.8% had a female householder with no husband present, and 34.9% were non-families. 30.1% of all households were made up of individuals, and 24.1% had someone living alone who was 65 years of age or older. The average household size was 2.14 and the average family size was 2.67.

In the city, the population was spread out, with 15.2% under the age of 18, 5.6% from 18 to 24, 27.0% from 25 to 44, 14.0% from 45 to 64, and 38.2% who were 65 years of age or older. The median age was 47 years. For every 100 females, there were 102.3 males. For every 100 females age 18 and over, there were 98.7 males.

The median income for a household in the city was $35,625, and the median income for a family was $42,500. Males had a median income of $29,792 versus $19,583 for females. The per capita income for the city was $25,612. About 8.3% of families and 9.5% of the population were below the poverty line, including none of those under the age of eighteen and 21.4% of those 65 or over.

Education
The municipality is within the Turkey Valley Community School District.

Notable person

Father Aloysius Schmitt (1909–1941), the first chaplain to die in World War II, on board the USS Oklahoma during the Pearl Harbor bombing

References

External links

 
City-Data Comprehensive Statistical Data and more about St. Lucas

Cities in Fayette County, Iowa
Cities in Iowa